Quentin Varin (1584 in Beauvais – 1626 in Paris), was a French Baroque painter.

Biography
According to the RKD he was the teacher of Nicolas Poussin. He is known for religious works.

References

Quentin Varin on Artnet

1584 births
1647 deaths
17th-century French painters
French Baroque painters
People from Beauvais